The ADG Excellence in Production Design Awards are awards presented annually by the Art Directors Guild (ADG) to recognize excellence in production design and art direction in the film and television industries. Honorees are presented with an award made by the New York firm Society Awards.

Film awards

Feature Film (1996–1999)

1996: The English Patient by art director Aurelio Crugnola and production designer Stuart Craig
1997: Titanic by art director Robert W. Laing, Martin Laing, Charles Dwight Lee and Bill Rea and production designer Peter Lamont
1998: What Dreams May Come by art director Christian Wintter and production designer Eugenio Zanetti
1999: Sleepy Hollow by art director Ken Court, John Dexter, Andy Nicholson, Kevin Phipps, John Wright Stevens and Leslie Tomkins and production designer Rick Heinrichs

Period or Fantasy Film (2000–2005)
2000: Gladiator by art director Adam O'Neill, Keith Pain, Clifford Robson and Peter Russell and production designer Arthur Max
2001: Moulin Rouge! by art director Annie Beauchamp and production designer Catherine Martin
2002: The Lord of the Rings: The Two Towers by art directors Joe Bleakley, Philip Ivey, Rob Outterside and Mark Robins and production designer Grant Major
2003: The Lord of the Rings: The Return of the King by art director Joe Bleakley, Simon Bright, Dan Hennah and Philip Ivey and production designer Grant Major
2004: Lemony Snicket's A Series of Unfortunate Events by art directors John Dexter, Tony Fanning, William Hawkins and Martin Whist and production designer Rick Heinrichs
2005: Memoirs of a Geisha by art director Patrick M. Sullivan Jr. and production designer John Myhre

Period Film (2006–present)

2006: Curse of the Golden Flower by art directors Chengguang Dong, Hongwu Sun, Xinhua Wei and Minxuan Zong and production designer Tingxiao Huo
2007: There Will Be Blood by production designer Jack Fisk
2008: The Curious Case of Benjamin Button by production designer Don Graham Burt
2009: Sherlock Holmes by production designer Sarah Greenwood
2010: The King's Speech by production designer Eve Stewart
2011: Hugo by production designer Dante Ferretti
2012: Anna Karenina by production designer Sarah Greenwood
 2013: The Great Gatsby by production designer Catherine Martin
2014: The Grand Budapest Hotel by production designer Adam Stockhausen
2015: The Revenant by production designer Jack Fisk
2016: Hidden Figures by production designer Wynn Thomas
2017: The Shape of Water by production designer Paul Denham Austerberry
2018: The Favourite  by production designer Fiona Crombie
2019: Once Upon a Time...in Hollywood  by production designer Barbara Ling
2020: Mank by production designer Donald Graham Burt
2021: Nightmare Alley by production designer Tamara Deverell
2022: Babylon by production designer Florencia Martin

Fantasy Film (2006–present)

2006: Pan's Labyrinth by production designer Eugenio Caballero
2007: The Golden Compass by production designer Dennis Gassner
2008: The Dark Knight by production designer Nathan Crowley
2009: Avatar by production designers Rick Carter and Robert Stromberg
2010: Inception by production designer Guy Hendrix Dyas
2011: Harry Potter and the Deathly Hallows – Part 2 by production designer Stuart Craig
2012: Life of Pi by production designer David Gropman
 2013: Gravity by production designer Andy Nicholson
 2014: Guardians of the Galaxy by production designer Charles Wood
 2015: Mad Max: Fury Road by production designer Colin Gibson
 2016: Passengers by production designer Guy Hendrix Dyas
 2017: Blade Runner 2049 by production designer Dennis Gassner
 2018: Black Panther by production designer Hannah Beachler
2019: Avengers: Endgame  by production designer Charles Wood
2020: Tenet by production designer Nathan Crowley
2021: Dune by production designer Patrice Vermette
2022: Everything Everywhere All at Once by production designer Jason Kisvarday

Contemporary Film (2000–present)

2000: Chocolat by art director Lucy Richardson by production designer David Gropman
2001: Amélie by art director Volker Schäfer by production designer Aline Bonetto
2002: Catch Me If You Can by art directors Sarah Knowles, Michele Laliberte and Peter Rogness by production designer Jeannine Claudia Oppewall 
2003: Mystic River by art director Jack G. Taylor Jr. and production designer Henry Bumstead
2004: The Terminal by art director Christopher Burian-Mohr and production designer Alex McDowell
2005: Walk the Line by art director John R. Jensen and Rob Simons and production designer David J. Bomba
2006: Casino Royale by art directors David Baxa, Susanna Codognato, Peter Francis, Fred Hole, Michael Lamont, Steven Lawrence, Dominic Masters, Alan Tomkins by production designer Peter Lamont
2007: No Country for Old Men by production designer Jess Gonchor
2008: Slumdog Millionaire by production designer Mark Digby
2009: The Hurt Locker by production designer Karl Julliusson
2010: Black Swan by production designer Therese DePrez
2011: The Girl with the Dragon Tattoo by production designer Don Graham Burt
2012: Skyfall by production designer Dennis Gassner
 2013: Her by production designer K.K. Barrett
 2014: Birdman or (The Unexpected Virtue of Ignorance) by production designer Kevin Thompson
 2015: The Martian by production designer Arthur Max
 2016: La La Land by production designer David Wasco
 2017: Logan by production designer François Audouy
 2018: Crazy Rich Asians by production designer Nelson Coates
 2019: Parasite by production designer Lee Ha-Jun
 2020: Da 5 Bloods by production designer Wynn Thomas
 2021: No Time to Die by production designer Mark Tildesley
 2022: Glass Onion: A Knives Out Mystery by production designer Rick Heinrichs

Animated Film (2017–present) 

2017: Coco by production designer Harley Jessup
2018: Isle of Dogs by production designers Paul Harrod and Adam Stockhausen
2019: Toy Story 4 by production designer Bob Pauley
2020: Soul by production designer Steve Pilcher
2021: Encanto by production designers Ian Gooding and Lorelay Bové
2022: Guillermo del Toro's Pinocchio by production designers Guy Davis and Curt Enderle

Television

TV Series (1996–1999)
1996: Star Trek: Deep Space Nine by art director Randall McIlvain and production designer Herman F. Zimmerman
1997: Brooklyn South by art director Lee Mayman and production designer Paul Eads
1998: The X Files by art director Sandy Getzler and Lauren E. Polizzi and production designer Corey Kaplan
1999: The West Wing (for episode "Pilot") by art director Tony Fanning and production designer Jon Hutman

Single Camera Series (2000–2007)
2000: The X-Files (for "Without") by production designer Corey Kaplan
2001: Six Feet Under (for "Pilot") by production designer Marcia Hinds
2002: Alias (for "Cipher") by production designer Scott Chambliss
2003: Carnivàle (for "Milfay") by production designer Bernt Capra
2004: Desperate Housewives (for "Ah, But Underneath") by production designer Thomas Walsh
2005: Rome (for "The Stolen Eagle") by art directors Dominic Hyman, Carlo Serafin and Domenico Sica and production designer Joseph Bennett
2006: Ugly Betty (for "The Box and the Bunny") by art directors Charles E. McCarry
2007: Mad Men (for "Shoot") by production designer Dan Bishop

One-Hour Single Camera Series (2008–2013)
2008: Mad Men (for "The Jet Set") by production designer Dan Bishop
2009: Mad Men (for "Souvenir") by production designer Dan Bishop
2010: Mad Men (for "Public Relations") by production designer Dan Bishop
2011: Boardwalk Empire (for "21") by production designer Bill Groom
 2012: Game of Thrones (for "The Ghost of Harrenhal") by production designer Gemma Jackson
 2013: Game of Thrones (for "Valar Dohaeris") by production designer Gemma Jackson

One-Hour Period or Fantasy Single-Camera Television Series (2014–present)
 2014: Game of Thrones (for "The Laws of Gods and Men") by production designer Deborah Riley
 2015: Game of Thrones (for "Hardhome", "High Sparrow", "Unbowed, Unbent, Unbroken") by production designer Deborah Riley
 2016: Westworld (for "The Original") by production designer Nathan Crowley
 2017: Game of Thrones (for "Dragonstone", "The Queen's Justice", "Eastwatch") by production designer Deborah Riley
2018: The Marvelous Mrs. Maisel (for "Simone") by production designer Bill Groom
2019: The Marvelous Mrs. Maisel (for "Ep. 305, Ep. 308") by production designer Bill Groom
2020: The Mandalorian (for "Chapter 13: The Jedi") by production designers Andrew L. Jones and Doug Chiang

One-Hour Contemporary Single-Camera Television Series (2014–present)
 2014: True Detective (for "The Locked Room", "Form and Void") by production designer Alex DiGerlando
 2015: House of Cards (for "Chapter 29", "Chapter 36") by production designer Steve Arnold
 2016: Mr. Robot (for "eps2.0_unm4sk-pt1.tc", "eps2.4_m4ster-slave.aes", "eps2.9_pyth0n-pt1.p7z") by production designer Anastasia White
 2017: The Handmaid's Tale (for "Offred", "Birth Day", "Nolite Te Bastardes Carborundorum") by production designer Julie Berghoff
2018: The Handmaid's Tale (for "June", "Unwomen") by production designers Mark White and Elisabeth Williams
2019: The Umbrella Academy (for "We Only See Each Other at Weddings and Funerals") by production designer Mark Worthington
2020: Ozark (for "Wartime") by production designer David Bomba

Half Hour Single-Camera Television Series (2008 to present)
2008: Weeds (for "Excellent Treasures") by production designer Joseph P. Lucky
2009: Weeds (for "Ducks and Tigers") by production designer Joseph P. Lucky
2010: Modern Family (for "Halloween") by production designer Richard Berg
2011: Modern Family (for "Express Christmas") by production designer Richard Berg
 2012: Girls (for "Pilot") by production designer Judy Becker
 2013: Veep (for "Helsinki") by production designer Jim Gloster
 2014: Silicon Valley (for "Articles of Incorporation", "Signaling Risk", "Optimal Tip-to-Tip Efficiency") by production designer Richard Toyon
 2015: The Muppets (for "The Ex-Factor", "Pig's in a Blackout") by production designer Denise Pizzini
 2016: Mozart in the Jungle (for "Now I Will Sing") by production designer Tommaso Ortino
 2017: GLOW (for "Pilot", "The Wrath of Kuntar", "The Dusty Spur") by production designer Todd Fjelsted
2018: GLOW (for "Viking Funeral") by production designer Todd Fjelsted
2019: Russian Doll (for "Nothing in This World Is Easy") by production designer Michael Bricker
2020: What We Do in the Shadows (for "Resurrection", "Collaboration", "Witches") by production designer Kate Bunch

Multi-Camera, Variety, or Unscripted Series (2000–2013)
2000: Bette (for "Pilot") by production designer Bernard Vyzga
2001: Will and Grace (for "Prison Blues") by production designer Glenda Rovello
2002: Titus (for "Into Thin Air") by production designer Stephen Olson
2003: Arrested Development by production designer Dawn Snyder
2004: Will & Grace (for "Queens for a Day") by production designer Glenda Rovello
2005: MADtv (for Episode #1106) by production designer John Sabato
2006: MADtv (for Episode #1207) by production designer John Sabato
2007: MADtv (for Episode #1221) by production designer John Sabato
2008: Little Britain USA (for "Episode 4") by production designers Greg Grande and Michael Wylie
2009: Hell's Kitchen (for Episode #604) by production designer John Janavs
2010: Saturday Night Live (for "Betty White/Jay-Z") by production designers Keith Raywood, Eugene Lee, Akira Yoshimura and N. Joseph De Tullio
2011: Saturday Night Live (for "Justin Timberlake/Lady Gaga") by production designers Keith Raywood, Eugene Lee, Akira Yoshimura and N. Joseph De Tullio
 2012: Saturday Night Live (for "Mick Jagger") by production designers Keith Raywood, Eugene Lee, Akira Yoshimura and N. Joseph De Tullio
 2013: Portlandia (for "Missionaries") by production designer Tyler Robinson

Multi-Camera Series (2014–present)
 2014: The Big Bang Theory (for "The Locomotive Manipulation", "The Convention Conundrum", "The Status Quo Combustion") by production designer John Shaffner
 2015: The Big Bang Theory (for "The Mystery Date Observation", "The Platonic Permutation", "The Skywalker Incursion") by production designer John Shaffner'
 2016: The Great Indoors (for "Pilot") by production designer Glenda Rovello
 2017: Will & Grace (for "11 Years Later", "A Gay Olde Christmas") by production designer Glenda Rovello
2018: Sesame Street (for "Book Worming," "The Count's Counting Error," "Street Food") by production designer David Gallo
2019: The Big Bang Theory (for "The Stockholm Syndrome," "The Conference Valuation," "The Propagation Proposition") by production designer John Shaffner
2020: Will & Grace (for "Accidentally on Porpoise", "We Love Lucy", "It's Time") by production designer Glenda Rovello

Variety, Competition, Reality, or Game Show Series (2014–2016) 
 2014: Portlandia (for "Celery") by production designer Tyler Robinson
 2015: Key & Peele (for "Ya'll Ready For This?", "The End") by production designer Gary Kordan
 2016: Saturday Night Live (for "Larry David/The 1975", "Peter Dinklage/Gwen Stefani", "Tom Hanks/Lady Gaga") by production designers Keith Raywood, Eugene Lee, Akira Yoshimura and N. Joseph DeTullio

Awards Show, Variety, Music, or Non-Fiction Program (1997–2011)
1997: Rodgers & Hammerstein's Cinderella by production designer Randy Ser
1998: 70th Academy Awards by production designer Roy Christopher
1999: 71st Academy Awards by production designer Roy Christopher
2000: 72nd Academy Awards by production designer Bob Keene
2001: 73rd Academy Awards by production designer Roy Christopher
2002: Opening Ceremony Salt Lake 2002 Olympic Winter Games by production designer Jeremy Railton
2003: 75th Academy Awards by production designer Roy Christopher
2004: 76th Academy Awards by production designer Roy Christopher
2005: 77th Academy Awards by production designer Roy Christopher
2006: 58th Annual Emmy Awards by production designer John Shaffner
2007: Hell's Kitchen (for Episode #301) by production designer John R. Janavs
2008: 80th Academy Awards by production designer Roy Christopher
2009: 51st Grammy Awards by production designers Brian Stonestreet and Steve Bass
2010: 82nd Academy Awards by production designer David Rockwell
2011: 83rd Academy Awards by production designer Steve Bass

Awards, Music, or Game Shows (2012–2013) 
2012: 84th Academy Awards by production designer John Myhre
2013: The 66th Annual Tony Awards by production designer Steve Bass

Awards or Event Special (2014–2016)
2014: 86th Academy Awards by production designer Derek McLane
2015: 87th Academy Awards by production designer Derek McLane
2016: Beyoncé: Lemonade by production designer Hannah Beachler

Variety or Reality or Event Special (2017–present)
 2017: Portlandia (for "Portland Secedes", "Ants", "Fred's Cell Phone Company") by production designer Schuyler Telleen
2018: 90th Academy Awards by production designer Derek McLane
2019: Drunk History (for "Are You Afraid of the Drunk") by production designer Monica Sotto
2020: Saturday Night Live (for "Host: John Mulaney + Music: David Byrne", "Host: Adele + Music: H.E.R.", "Host: Dave Chappelle + Music: Foo Fighters") by production designers Keith Raywood, Eugene Lee, Akira Yoshimura, N. Joseph De Tullio

Television Movie or Limited Series (1997–present)
1997: George Wallace by art director Charles M. Lagola by production designer Michael Z. Hanan
1998: From the Earth to the Moon by art director Seth Reed and production designer Richard Toyon
1999: Introducing Dorothy Dandridge by art director A. Leslie Thomas and production designer James H. Spencer
2000: The '70s by art director Ron Mason and production designer John T. Walker
2001: The Last Brickmaker in America by art director Jim Gloster and production designer William J. Creber
2002: Live from Baghdad by art directors Matthew C. Jacobs and Karen Steward and production designer Richard Hoover
2003: Angels in America by art directors John Kasarda and Stefano Maria Ortolani and production designer Stuart Wurtzel
2004: And Starring Pancho Villa as Himself by art director Bernardo Trujillo and production designer Herbert Pinter
2005: Empire Falls by art director John Kasarda and production designer Stuart Wurtzel
2006: Desperation by art director Jason Weil and production designer Phil Dagort
2007: PU 239 by production designer Tom Meyer
2008: John Adams by production designer Gemma Jackson
2009: Grey Gardens by production designer Kaliva Ivanov
2010: Secrets in the Walls by production designer Robb Wilson King
2011: Mildred Pierce by production designer Mark Friedberg
2012: American Horror Story: Asylum (for "I Am Anne Frank, Part 2") by production designer Mark Worthington
2013: Behind the Candelabra by production designer Howard Cummings
2014: American Horror Story: Freak Show (for "Massacres and Matinees") by production designer Mark Worthington
2015: American Horror Story: Hotel (for "Checking In") by production designer Mark Worthington
2016: The Night Of (for "The Beach") by production designer Patrizia von Brandenstein
2017: Black Mirror (for "USS Callister") by production designer Joel Collins
2018: The Alienist (for "The Boys on the Bridge") by production designer Mara LaPere-Schloop
2019: Chernobyl by production designer Luke Hull
2020: The Queen's Gambit by production designer Uli Hanisch

Short Format, Live Action Series (2013) 
 2013: Battlestar Galactica: Blood & Chrome (for "Episode 1") by production designer Brian Kane

Short Format: Web Series, Music Video or Commercial (2004-present)
2007: Budweiser Commercial: Space Station. by production designer Jeremy Reed
2008: Farmers Insurance Commercial: Drowned Circus. by production designer Chris Gorak & Victoria's Secret Commercial: Holiday. by production designer Jeffrey Beecroft 
2009: Absolut Anthem Commercial: In An Absolut World. by production designer James Chinlund 
2010: Dos Equis Commercial: Ice Fishing. by production designer Jesse B. Benson
2011: Activision: Call of Duty Commercial: Modern Warfare 3. by production designer Neil Spisak
2012: Xbox: Halo 4 Commercial: Commissioning. by production designer Christopher Glass
2013: Activision: Call of Duty: Ghosts Commercial: Epic Night Out. by production designer Todd Cherniawsky
2014: Apple Commercial: Perspective. by production designer Sean Hargreaves
2015: Apple Music Commercial: The History of Sound. by production designer Jess Gonchor
2016: iPhone 7 Commercial: Balloons. by production designer James Chinlund
2017: Star Wars Battlefront II Commercial: "Rivalry / PS4." by production designer Jason Edmonds
2018: Apple Commercial: "Welcome Home." by production designer Christopher Glass
2019: MedMen (for "The New Normal") by production designer James Chinlund
2020: Harry Styles Music Video for Falling by production designer François Audouy
2021: Apple Music Commercial: “Happier Than Ever” by production designer François Audouy

Short Format: Music Videos (2022-present) 
2022: Taylor Swift's All Too Well: The Short Film; production designers Ethan Tobman, Mila Khalevich, and Emil Pilosov

References 
 1996 Awards
 1997 Awards
 1998 Awards
 1999 Awards
 2000 Awards
 2001 Awards
 2002 Awards
 2003 Awards
 2004 Awards
 2005 Awards
 2006 Awards
 2007 Awards
 2008 Awards
 2009 Awards
 2010 Awards
 2011 Awards
 2012 Awards
 2013 Awards
 2014 Awards
 2015 Awards

 
American film awards
American television awards
International Alliance of Theatrical Stage Employees
Awards established in 1996
Awards for best art direction